Events from the year 1906 in China.

Incumbents
Guangxu Emperor (26th year)

Events
 April 27 - Chinese representative Tang Shaoyi and the British Ambassador to China, Ernest Mason Satow, formally signed the Convention Between Great Britain and China Respecting Tibet. Britain agreed not to occupy Tibet and not to interfere in Tibetan politics.

Births
 Fei Mu -  October 10, 1906
 Aisin Gioro Puyi

References

 
1900s in China
Years of the 20th century in China